Nağılar (also, Naghilar) is a village de jure in the Shusha District of Azerbaijan, de facto in the Shushi Province of the self-proclaimed Republic of Artsakh.

References 

Populated places in Shusha District